{{Infobox football club
| clubname = Ebusua Dwarfs
| current = 2020–21 Ghana Premier League
| image = 
| caption = Club logo
| fullname = Cape Coast Mysterious Ebusua Dwarfs Football Club
| nickname = Ebusua DwarfsThe Crabs''Mysterious' Dwarfs
| founded = 
| formernames = 
| dissolved = 
| ground = Cape Coast Sports Stadium, Cape Coast
| capacity = 15,000
| owntitle = 
| owner = 
| chrtitle = President
| chairman = Nana Sam Brew Butler
| league = Ghana Premier League
| season = 2019–20
| position = 16th
| website = http://ebusuadwarfsfc.com/
| kit_alt1 = 
| pattern_la1 = _greenborder
| pattern_b1 = _yellowborder
| pattern_ra1 = _greenborder
| pattern_sh1 = _yellowborder
| pattern_so1 = _yellowborder
| leftarm1 = FFFF00
| body1 = FFFF00
| rightarm1 = FFFF00
| shorts1 = 228B22
| socks1 = FFFF00
| kit_alt2 = 
| pattern_la2 = 
| pattern_b2 = 
| pattern_ra2 = 
| pattern_sh2 = 
| pattern_so2 = 
| leftarm2 = FF4500
| body2 = FF4500
| rightarm2 = FF4500
| shorts2 = FF4500
| socks2 = FF4500
| firstgame = 
| largestwin = 
| worstdefeat = 
| topscorer = 
| fansgroup = 
| honours = 
| American = 
| manager = Ernest Thompson Quartey
}}

Cape Coast Mysterious Ebusua Dwarfs is a Ghanaian professional football club based in Cape Coast. The club competes in the Ghana Premier League, the Premier division on the Ghanaian football pyramid, and hold home games at Cape Coast Sports Stadium.

History
Founded in 1932, Ebusua Dwarfs were one of the founding members of the Ghana Premier League and won the 1966 Ghana Premier League. Ebusua Dwarfs is the first winner of the Presidential cup in 1970 when the idea of FA cup and League Championships was introduced in Ghana. It was called the Prime Minister's cup. Ebusua Dwarfs again won the first SWAG Cup by beating Hearts of Oak 4–2. Ebusua Dwarfs is one of the eight teams invited to play in the first-ever Ghana FA Cup, losing 6–0 in the semifinals to Hearts of Oak after defeating their rivals Vipers 2–0. Dwarfs defeated Ho Mighty Eagles 4–2 to win the 1968 FA Cup final.

The Dwarfs also appeared in the 1993 and 1994 finals, losing on penalties to Goldfields in 1993 and losing to Hearts of Oak in 1994 2–1 after taking a lead. Cape Coast Mysterious Dwarfs FC is the third Ghanaian club to represent Ghana in Africa after Real Republicans and Asante Kotoko in that order.

Cape Coast Dwarfs appeared in the 2000 CAF Cup, losing to Ismaily of Egypt 6–0 in the quarterfinals but not before defeating Wydad Casablanca.

Famous Black Stars goalkeeper Robert Mensah got his start with the Dwarfs in the 1960s.

Nana Aidoo, the Dwarfs CEO and chief financier, died in 2018.

Grounds
Cape Coast Ebusua Dwarfs play home matches at the Cape Coast Sports Stadium. The Cape Coast Sports Stadium holds an estimated capacity of 15,000 seats. 
The club plans to build a state-of-the-art facility after the supporters purchased a parcel of land to build their first training pitch

Rivalries
Cape Coast Mysterious Ebusua Dwarfs' longest established rivalry is with Cape Coast Venomous Vipers FC. Elmina Sharks FC. have also been considered as local rivals in recent times.

Honours
National Titles
Ghana Premier League: 1
1965–66

FA Cup: 1
1968

Performance in CAF competitions
CAF Cup
2000 CAF Cup - quarterfinals

CAF Confederation Cup: 1 appearance
2014 - First Round

Current squadAs of February 2021. 

 Club captains 

 Nicholas Gyan (2016–2018)
 Joseph Amoah Mensah (2018)
 Dennis Nkrumah-Korsah (2019–present)

References

External links
Team profile - soccerway.com - twitter.com - plus.google.com - facebook.com''

Cape Coast
Football clubs in Ghana
Sports clubs in Ghana
1932 establishments in Gold Coast (British colony)
Association football clubs established in 1932